Marcus is an unincorporated community in Meade County, in the U.S. state of South Dakota.

History
A post office called Marcus was established in 1909. Marcus Connelly, an early postmaster, gave the community his name.

References

Unincorporated communities in Meade County, South Dakota
Unincorporated communities in South Dakota